Jeanette Koppensteiner was an Austrian luger who competed in the late 1980s and early 1990s. A natural track luger, she won the women's singles gold medal at the 1990 FIL World Luge Natural Track Championships in Gsies, Italy.

Koppensteiner also won a silver medal in the women's singles event at the 1989 FIL European Luge Natural Track Championships in Garmisch-Partenkirchen, West Germany.

References
Natural track European Championships results 1970-2006.
Natural track World Championships results: 1979-2007

Austrian female lugers
Year of birth missing (living people)
Living people
20th-century Austrian women